Bakhshi-Wazir were a Pakistani composer duo who created music for films, television, and radio from the 1960s to the 1990s. The duo partnered two musicians Wazir Hussain and Bakhshi from Lahore. The duo is primarily known for composing a Punjabi song "Jadon Houly Jayi Laina Mera Naa" (Singer: Noor Jehan, Movie:  Att Khuda Da Vair) in 1970 that became an iconic track in Pakistan's Punjabi music history.

Career
The musicians Wazir Hussain and Bakhshi were two friends from Bhati Gate, Lahore, who later formed a musical duo as Bakhshi-Wazir. Wazir Hussain, who got music training from his paternal uncle Chote Ashiq Ali Khan, was expert in Raags, whereas Bukhshi was skilled in percussion, orchestra, and other musical arrangements. Starting their music career in 1961 with a film "Bekhabar", the duo wasted little time in making their reputation in the Lollywood films. At the end, they had composed playback music for around 250 films.

The Punjabi song "Jadon Holi Jai Laina Mera Naa" from the film "Att Khuda Da Vair" (1970), continues to be the song Bukhshi-Wazir are best known for. Vocalized by the singer Noor Jehan, this Raag Darbari-based song has gained popularity over the past three decades. Reportedly, the first two lines of this song's opening verse were written by poet Tanvir Naqvi over the course of an entire evening, and the remaining verses were finished the next day.

The other milestone of their career was the Punjabi song "Akh Lari Bado Badi" again sung by Noor Jehan for the film "Banarasi Thhag" (1973). Pictured on the actress Mumtaz, that club dance composition was a sensational hit of the era.

Once the demand for Bakhshi-Wazir's music in the Lollywood declined, they began composing music for Radio Pakistan and  PTV.
One of their significant projects was the narration of Syed Rizi Tirmizi'''s recording of the poet and philosopher Muhammad Iqbal's poems on CPU, Radio Pakistan, which included the voice of actor  Muhammad Ali.

Death
Wazeer Hussain died on January 11, 1997.

Notable compositions
Bakhshi Wazir composed playback music for 10 Urdu and 54 Punjabi movies:
 1966 (Film: Chughalkhor - Punjabi) — Assin Pichhli Raat Day Taray, Tay Saday Naal Pyar Na Karin... Singer(s): Irene Parveen, Poet: Hazeen Qadri
 1966 (Film: Chughalkhour - Punjabi) — Mukh Tera Wekhya, Zaroor Thora Jeya Ni... Singer(s): Masood Rana, Poet: Hazin Qadri
 1966 (Film: Nizam Lohar - Punjabi) — Pyar Kissay Naal Pavin Na, Kei Rupan Wich Phirn Behrupi... Singer(s): Masood Rana, Poet: Tanvir Naqvi
 1968 (Film: 5 Darya - Punjabi) — Meray Sajray, Phullan Day Gajray, Kandeyan Day Wass Paiy Geye... Singer(s): Noor Jehan, Poet: Baba Alam Siaposh
 1968 (Film: Pind Di Kurri - Punjabi) — Ajj Pind Di Kurri Rahwan Bhull Geyi A... Singer(s): Nazir Begum, Irene Parveen, Poet: Khawaja Parvez
 1970 (Film: Mehram Dil Da - Punjabi) — Kinnu Haal Sunawan Dil Da, Koi Mehram Raaz Na Milda... Singer(s): Noor Jehan, Poet: Sultan Mehmood Ashufta
 1970 (Film: Att Khuda Da Vair - Punjabi) — Jaddun Holi Jeyi Laina Mera Naa, Main Than Marr Jani Aan... Singer(s): Noor Jehan, Poet: Tanvir Naqvi
 1972 (Film: Main Akela - Urdu) — Manzil Hay Na Hamdam Hay, Kuchh Hay To Agar Dam Hi Dam Hay... Singer(s): Masood Rana, Poet: ?
 1972 (Film: Ik Pyar Tay Do Parchhawen - Punjabi) — Es Jagg Di Jadun Tak Kahani Rahway... Singer(s): Tassawar Khanum, Poet: ?
 1973 (Film: Banarsi Thug - Punjabi) — Akh Lari Bado Badi, Moqa Milay Kadi Kadi... Singer(s): Noor Jehan, Poet: ?
 1973 (Film: Banarsi Thug - Punjabi) — Nashiyaan Nay Sarya, Hulya Vagarya... Singer(s): Masood Rana, Poet: Khawaja Pervaiz
 1976 (Film: Ultimatum - Punjabi) — Eina Sohniya Da Dosto, Yaarana Bura Honda Jay... Singer(s): Inayat Hussain Bhatti, Poet: Waris Ludhyanvi
 1976 (Film: Akhar - Punjabi) — Jan Kadh Leyi Aa BeImana, Jan Wali Gall Kar Kay''... Singer(s): Afshan, Poet: ?

References

Pakistani film score composers
Pakistani musical duos
People from Lahore
Year of birth missing
1997 deaths